Adriana Falcão (born in 1960 in Rio de Janeiro) is a Brazilian screenwriter.

Life
Born in Rio de Janeiro but moved to Recife at 11 years old.

First her father committed suicide and later her mother too, taking a fatal dose of sleeping pills.

Graduated in architecture, but never worked in the profession.

Works
Her first novel was The Machine (A máquina); as a screenwriter wrote for series such as Comedy privacy (Comédias da vida privada), A grande familia (A large family, also wrote the screenplays for the film. Currently publishes chronic in the paper O Estado de Sao Paulo.

Television

 Só Dez por Cento é Mentira  (2008) - Producer
 Eu e Meu Guarda-Chuva  (2010)
 Se Eu Fosse Você 2  (2009)
 A Mulher Invisível  (2008)
 Chega de Saudade  (2007)
 Fica Comigo Esta Noite  (2006)
 Irma Vap - O Retorno (2006)
 O Ano em Que Meus Pais Saíram de Férias  (2006)
 Se Eu Fosse Você  (2006)
 O Auto da Compadecida

Screenwriter
 Quer Tapioca com Manteiga, Freguesa?  (1985)
 A Grande Família  (2001)
 O Auto da Compadecida  (1999)

Others 
 A Máquina (Editora Objetiva, 1999)
 Mania de Explicação  (2001)
 Luna Clara & Apolo Onze (2002)
 Histórias dos tempos de escola: Memória e aprendizado (2002);
 Pequeno dicionário de palavras ao vento (2003);
 Contos de estimação (Editora Objetiva, 2003);
 A comédia dos anjos (2004);
 PS Beijei (2004);
 A tampa do céu (2005),
 Contos de escola (2005);
 O Zodíaco – Doze signos, doze histórias (2005);
 Tarja preta (Editora Objetiva, 2005)
 Sonho de uma noite de verão (Coleção Devorando Shakespeare, Editora Objetiva, 2007)
 A arte de virar a página (2009) (Editora Fontanar. Com imagens de Leonardo Miranda)

References

External links 
 Releituras with Adriana Falcão
 Entrevista with Adriana Falcão
 

Brazilian screenwriters
1960 births
Living people
Brazilian women screenwriters
20th-century Brazilian women
21st-century Brazilian women